This is a list of ski areas and resorts in Canada.

Alberta

WinSport's Canada Olympic Park (1988 Winter Olympics sliding and jumping events)
Banff Sunshine - Banff
Canmore Nordic Centre (1988 Winter Olympics Nordic and biathlon events)
Canyon Ski Area - Red Deer
Castle Mountain Resort - Pincher Creek
Eastlink Park - Whitecourt, Alberta
Edmonton Ski Club
Fairview Ski Hill - Fairview 
Fortress Mountain Resort - Kananaskis Country, Alberta between Calgary and Banff
Innisfail Ski Hill - in Innisfail
 Kinosoo Ridge Ski Resort - Cold Lake
Lake Louise Mountain Resort - Lake Louise in Banff National Park
Little Smokey Ski Area - Falher, Alberta
Marmot Basin - Jasper
Misery Mountain, Alberta  - Peace River
Mount Norquay ski resort - Banff
Nakiska (1988 Winter Olympics)
Nitehawk Ski Area - Grande Prairie
Rabbit Hill Snow Resort  - Leduc
Silver Summit  - Edson
Snow Valley Ski Club  - city of Edmonton
Sunridge Ski Area - city of Edmonton
Tawatinaw Valley Ski Club - Tawatinaw, Alberta
Valley Ski Club - Alliance, Alberta
Vista Ridge - in Fort McMurray
Whispering Pines ski resort - Worsley

British Columbia

Apex Mountain Resort, Penticton
Bear Mountain Ski Hill, Dawson Creek
Big Bam Ski Hill, Fort St. John (Closed)
Big White Ski Resort, Kelowna
Burke Mountain Ski Area, Coquitlam (Closed) 
Crystal Mountain, West Kelowna (Closed)
Cypress Mountain, West Vancouver
Fairmont Hot Springs Resort, Fairmont Hot Springs
Fernie Alpine Resort, Fernie
Forbidden Plateau Ski Area, Courtenay-Comox (Closed)
Grouse Mountain, North Vancouver
Harper Mountain, Kamloops
Hart Highlands Ski Hill, Prince George
Hudson Bay Mountain, Smithers
Jumbo Glacier, Invermere (Development stalled)
Kicking Horse Resort, Golden
Kimberley Alpine Resort, Kimberley
Little Mac Ski Hill, Mackenzie
Manning Park (Gibson Pass), Hope-Princeton
Mount Baldy Ski Area, Oliver (Baldy Mountain Resort)
Mount Cain Ski Area, Vancouver Island
Mount Seymour, North Vancouver
Mount Timothy Ski Area, Lac La Hache/100 Mile
Mount Washington Alpine Resort, Vancouver Island
Murray Ridge Ski Area, Fort St. James
Panorama Mountain Resort, Invermere
Phoenix Mountain Ski Resort, Phoenix-Greenwood
Powder King Mountain Resort, Mackenzie/Pine Pass
Purden Ski Village, Prince George
Red Mountain Resort, Rossland
Revelstoke Mountain Resort, Revelstoke
Salmo Ski Area, Salmo
Sasquatch Mountain Resort, Chehalis/Harrison Mills
Shames Mountain, Terrace
Silver Star Mountain Resort, Vernon
Silvertip Ski Area, Sunshine Valley, Hope-Princeton (closed)
Summit Lake Ski Area, Nakusp
Sun Peaks Resort, Kamloops
Tabor Mountain Alpine Resort, Prince George
Troll Ski Resort, Quesnel-Wells
Whistler Blackcomb, Whistler
Whitewater Ski Resort, Nelson

Manitoba

Asessippi Ski Area
Falcon Ridge Ski Area
Holiday Mountain Ski Resort
Mount Agassiz Ski Resort (closed)
Mystery Mountain Winter Park
Ski Valley (Minnedosa)
Springhill Winter Sports Park
Stony Mountain Ski Area
Thunderhill Ski Area

New Brunswick

Crabbe Mountain
Mount Farlagne
Poley Mountain
Sugarloaf

Newfoundland and Labrador

Marble Mountain 
Menihek Nordic Ski Club (Labrador West)
Smokey Mountain Ski Club (Labrador West)
Snow Goose Mountain Park and Resort (Central Labrador)
Birch Brook Nordic Ski Club (Central Labrador)
White Hills

Northwest Territories

 Bristol Pit, Yellowknife

Nova Scotia

Ski Ben Eoin 
Ski Cape Smokey, Ingonish
Ski Martock
Ski Wentworth

Ontario

Adanac Ski Hill
Alpine Ski Club of Toronto
Antoine Mountain
Batawa Ski Hill
Beaver Valley Ski Club
Blue Mountain
Boler Mountain
Brimacombe
Calabogie Peaks
Caledon Ski Club
Centennial Park
Chicopee
Cobble Hills Ski Club
Craigleith Ski Club
Dagmar
Devil's Elbow Ski Area
Devil's Glen Country Club
Dryden Ski Club 
Dummy's hill
Georgian Peaks Club
Glen Eden
Gravenhurst Nordic Trails
Hardwood Hills
The Heights of Horseshoe Ski and Country Club
Hidden Valley Highlands
Highlands Nordic
Hockley Valley
Horseshoe Valley
Kamiskotia Snow Resort
Kawartha Nordic Ski Club
Lakeridge Ski Resort
Laurentian Ski Hill
Loch Lomond Skzi Area
Mansfield Outdoor Center
Mansfield Ski Club
Mount Baldy (Ontario) Ski Area
Mount Chinguacousy
Mount Dufour
Mount Martin Ski Club
Mount Pakenham
Mount St. Louis Moonstone
Mountain View Ski Area
North York Ski Center
Old Smokey (closed)
Onaping Ski Hill
Oshawa Ski Club
Osler Bluff Ski Club
Pine Ridge Ski Club
Searchmont Resort
Sir Sam's Ski Area
Ski Snow Valley
Skyloft Ski Country Club
Superior Slopes
Talisman Resort (closed)
Trestle Ridge Ski Slopes
Uplands Ski Area

Prince Edward Island

Brookvale Winter Activity Park

Quebec

Camp Fortune
Groupe Plein Air Terrebonne
Belle Neige
Bellevue
Club Tobo-Ski
Edelweiss Valley
Gray Rocks
Le Massif
Massif du Sud
Mont Adstock
Mont Alta
Mont Avalanche
Ski Mont Blanc
Mont Cascades
Mont Castor
Mont Chalco
Mont Chilly
Mont Édouard
Mont Fortin
Mont Gabriel
Mont-Garceau
Mont Gleason
Mont Grand Fonds
Mont Habitant
Mont Kanasuta
Mont Lac-Vert
Mont La Réserve
Mont Olympia
Mont Orignal
Mont Saint-Mathieu
Mont Saint-Sauveur
Mont Sainte-Anne
Mont Shefford
Mont Ste. Marie
Via Sauvagia (formerly Ski Mont Sauvage) at Mont Sauvage
Mont Sutton
Mont Tremblant Resort
Mont-Video
Mont Villa Saguenay
MontJoye
Owl's Head
Parc du Mont-Comi
Pin Rouge
Le Relais
Ski Bromont
Ski Chantecler
Ski Chic-Chocs
Ski La Reserve
Ski Mont Orford
Ski Mont Rigaud
Ski Mont Saint-Bruno
Ski Montcalm
Ski Morin Heights
Ski Sutton
Station de neige St-Pacome
Station de Ski Gallix
Stoneham
La Tuque
Val-d'Irene
Val Mauricie
Val Neigette
Val Saint-Come in Saint-Côme
La Valinouët
Vallee Bleue
Vallee du Parc
Vorlage

Saskatchewan

Blackstrap (closed)
Cypress Hills Ski Area
Duck Mountain Ski Area
Mission Ridge Winter Park
Ski Timber Ridge
Table Mountain Ski Resort
Wapiti Valley

Yukon

Mt Sima
Mt. Maichen
Moose Mountain

See also
List of heli-skiing operators in British Columbia
Former ski areas of Quebec

References

Further reading

External links
 

Canada
Ski areas
Ski areas and resorts